Protein kinase B, also known as Akt, is a serine/threonine-specific protein kinase.

AKT, Akt or akt may also refer to:

Organizations and companies 
 AKT Academy Matriculation Higher Secondary School, in India
 AKT motos, a Colombian motorcycle company
 akt (charity), a British charity for LGBTQ+ young people
 AKT InMotion, an American fitness company
 AKT II, a British construction and civil engineering company
 Agder Kollektivtrafikk (AKT), a Norwegian public transport administrator
 Akita Television (AKT), a Japanese television station
 Finnish Transport Workers' Union
 Musiikkituottajat (formerly known as ), a Finnish music organization
 Karat (airline) (ICAO: AKT), in Russia

Other uses 
 AKT1, AKT2, or AKT3, enzymes
 Erich Akt (1898–?), German politician
 Akolet language (ISO 639-3: akt), an Austronesian language
 RAF Akrotiri (IATA: AKT), an airport in Cyprus

See also 
 
 ACT (disambiguation)